Ozothamnus hookeri, commonly known as kerosene bush, is an aromatic shrub species, endemic to Australia. It grows to between 0.5 and 1 metre in height and has white-tomentose branchlets. The scale-like leaves are 4 to 5 mm long and 0.5 to 1 mm wide. These are green  on the upper surface, and white tomentose below. The flower heads  appear in dense clusters in summer and autumn The species occurs in boggy sites and subalpine heathland  New South Wales and Tasmania.

The species was formally described in 1853 by German botanist Otto Wilhelm Sonder.
The Latin specific epithet hookeri refers to the English botanist William Jackson Hooker (1785-1865).

References

hookeri
Asterales of Australia
Flora of New South Wales
Flora of Tasmania
Taxa named by Otto Wilhelm Sonder